CPBC may refer to:

 Canadian Professional Boxing Council, the sanctioning body for professional boxing in Canada
 Catholic Peace Broadcasting Corporation, a radio & television network of South Korea; see Andrew Yeom Soo-jung
 Communist Party of British Columbia
 Convention of Philippine Baptist Churches
Corpse Party: Blood Covered, a video game for the PC released in 2008